Methadone intermediate is a methadone precursor scheduled by UN Single Convention on Narcotic Drugs.  It is a Schedule II Narcotic controlled substance in the United States and has an ACSCN of 9254.  The 2014 annual manufacturing quota was 32 875 kilos.

See also 
 Moramide intermediate
 Pethidine intermediate A
 Pethidine intermediate B (norpethidine)
 Pethidine intermediate C (pethidinic acid)

References

Synthetic opioids
Drug rehabilitation
Dimethylamino compounds